Anne Blouin (born 14 September 1946) was a Progressive Conservative party member of the House of Commons of Canada. She was an executive assistant by career.

Blouin was elected at the Montmorency—Orléans electoral district in the 1984 federal election.  She left federal politics after her only term in office, the 33rd Canadian Parliament.

External links
 

1946 births
Living people
Members of the House of Commons of Canada from Quebec
Progressive Conservative Party of Canada MPs
Women members of the House of Commons of Canada
Women in Quebec politics